The Windtech Syncro is a Spanish single-place paraglider that was designed and produced by Windtech Parapentes of Gijón. It is now out of production.

Design and development
The Syncro was designed as an advanced cross country glider for experienced pilots. The models are each named for their approximate wing area in square metres.

The planform and aerofoil sections were computer designed for optimal glide over the speed range. The design incorporates a "Security Speed System", a combination of closed and half-closed cells on the leading edge to provide a more rigid shape.

The glider wing is made from Porcher Marine Skytex 44 g/m2 nylon fabric. The rib reinforcements are 180 g/m2 Dacron, with the trailing edge reinforcement fabricated of 175 g/m2 polyester. The lines are all sheathed Kevlar of 1.1 and 1.7 mm diameter. The risers are made from 20 mm wide Polyamida strapping.

Variants
Syncro 25
Small-sized model for lighter pilots. The glider model is AFNOR Performance certified.
Syncro 27
Mid-sized model for medium-weight pilots. The glider model is AFNOR Performance certified.
Syncro 29
Large-sized model for heavier pilots. The glider model is AFNOR Performance certified.

Specifications (Syncro 27)

References

External links

Syncro
Paragliders